Jamal Lee Adams (born October 17, 1995) is an American football strong safety for the Seattle Seahawks of the National Football League (NFL). He played college football at LSU, and was drafted sixth overall in the 2017 NFL Draft by the New York Jets. Adams quickly became an impactful starter for the Jets, making the Pro Bowl twice and being named an All-Pro. In 2021, Adams signed a four-year extension with the Seahawks valued at $72 million, with a $20 million signing bonus and $38 million guaranteed, making him the highest paid safety in the NFL at that time.

Early years
Adams attended Hebron High School in Carrollton, Texas. While there, he played high school football. During his final two years, he had 138 tackles and seven interceptions on defense and 20 touchdowns on offense. In his senior year, Hebron finished 8–4 on the season, advancing to the UIL 5A Division II Area final at AT&T Stadium, where they lost 42–21 to Cedar Hill.

Adams was rated by Scout.com as a five-star recruit and among the top 10 recruits in his class. He committed to Louisiana State University (LSU) to play college football.

College career
Adams played in all 13 games with two starts as a true freshman at LSU in 2014 and had 66 tackles and a sack. As a sophomore, he was a second-team All-Southeastern Conference selection as a safety by the Associated Press (AP) and SEC coaches. As a junior, Adams was named to the AP All-SEC first-team.

On January 6, 2017, Adams announced that he would forgo his senior season and enter the 2017 NFL Draft.

College statistics

Professional career
Coming out of college, Adams was invited to the NFL Combine and performed all the available drills. On May 4, 2017, Adams attended LSU's pro day and opted to run the 40-yard dash (4.33s) and was able to improve on his combine numbers significantly. He was projected to be a first-round pick by the majority of analysts and scouts. Sports Illustrated, DraftScout.com, Pro Football Focus, and ESPN ranked Adams the top safety in the draft.

The New York Jets selected Adams in the first round with the sixth overall pick in the 2017 NFL Draft. He was the first defensive back selected in 2017.

New York Jets

2017

On July 20, 2017, the Jets signed Adams to a fully guaranteed four-year, $22.25 million contract that included a $14.32 million signing bonus.

Adams entered training camp competing against Calvin Pryor and fellow rookie Marcus Maye for a role as a starting safety. Head coach Todd Bowles named Adams the starting strong safety to begin the regular season, alongside free safety Maye.

Adams made his professional regular season debut and first career start in the Jets season-opener versus the Buffalo Bills and recorded five combined tackles and deflected a pass in a 21–12 loss. Adams made his first career tackle on running back Mike Tolbert after his 13-yard run on the Bills' first drive. On September 24, Adams recorded two solo tackles, broke up a pass, and made his first career sack on quarterback Jay Cutler during a 20–6 win against the Miami Dolphins. In Week 17, he collected a season-high 10 combined tackles (three solo) and a pass deflection in the Jets' 26–6 loss to the New England Patriots.

2018
Adams was named a captain on the Jets' roster for the 2018 season. He got his first career interception off of Matt Cassel at the Jets' season opener versus the Detroit Lions. The Jets ultimately won the game 48–17. Adams finished his second season with 115 tackles, 3.5 sacks, three forced fumbles with one recovered fumble, and one interception and started all 16 games.

On December 18, Adams was named a Pro Bowl selection for the first time in his career. Adams was named Defensive MVP of the game. Adams became notorious after an incident where he tackled the New England Patriots mascot at a 2019 Pro Bowl practice. This was due to the fierce rivalry of the Jets and Patriots. Adams apologized and let the Patriots mascot tackle him back.

Adams was also named Second-team AP All-Pro during this season. On December 28, Adams was named Curtis Martin Team MVP.

2019

Before the 2019 season, Adams was ranked 37th among his fellow players on the NFL Top 100 2019 list.

On September 18, 2019, Adams was fined $21,000 for a hit he made on Baker Mayfield on Monday Night Football against the Cleveland Browns in Week 3. In Week 3 versus the New England Patriots, Adams recorded a 61-yard pick six off rookie quarterback Jarrett Stidham in the 30–14 loss. This was Adams' first interception of the season and his first career pick six. On October 10, Adams had his previous fine rescinded after winning an appeal.

During the NFL trade deadline, Adams voiced his displeasure regarding his name coming up in trade talks.  He stated that the Los Angeles Rams would never trade Aaron Donald and the New England Patriots would never trade Tom Brady.  Adams also said that when he found out that he was close to being traded, he would have loved to play for the Dallas Cowboys because he was from Dallas and because of his close relationship to former Cowboys' wide receiver Michael Irvin.  In the end, Adams revealed that although he was hurt to be involved in trade talks, he was still excited to play for the Jets.

In Week 10 against the New York Giants, Adams recorded a team-high nine tackles and sacked Daniel Jones twice, one of which was a strip sack that he forced and returned for a 25-yard touchdown, as the Jets won 34–27 win. He was named the AFC Defensive Player of the Week for his performance. During Week 11 versus the Washington Redskins, Adams finished with a career high three sacks as the Jets won 34–17. During a game versus the Cincinnati Bengals, Adams suffered an ankle injury at the start of the game. He played the entire game and had to miss the next two weeks due to this injury. He came back from his injury in Week 16 against the Pittsburgh Steelers in the Jets' 16–10 win. At the end of the season, he was named to his second consecutive Pro Bowl and was honored with his first career First-team AP selection. Adams also earned the Curtis Martin Team MVP for the second straight year.

On April 17, 2020, it was reported that Adams would skip the entirety of the voluntary virtual offseason program without a contract extension. On April 27, 2020, the Jets picked up the fifth-year option on Adams' contract. On June 12, 2020, Adams replied to an Instagram post stating that the Jets were "A lot of talk no action" regarding his desire for a contract extension. On June 18, 2020, Adams officially requested to be traded from the Jets. Adams created a list of teams, including his hometown Dallas Cowboys, that he would welcome to be traded to. The following week, Jets' head coach Adam Gase and defensive coordinator Gregg Williams expressed that they wanted to keep Adams. Adams was interviewed by the New York Daily News in July 2020, and he made critical remarks towards his head coach Adam Gase, saying that he was not the right leader for the Jets moving forward and that he did not build good relationships with people in the building. Adams also voiced his displeasure with how general manager Joe Douglas treated him during talks of a potential contract extension. He was ranked 27th by his fellow players on the NFL Top 100 Players of 2020.

Seattle Seahawks

2020

On July 25, 2020, Adams, along with a fourth-round pick in the 2022 NFL Draft, was traded to the Seattle Seahawks in exchange for safety Bradley McDougald, first- and third-round picks in the 2021 NFL Draft, and a first-round selection in the 2022 NFL Draft.

Adams made his debut with the Seahawks in Week 1 against the Atlanta Falcons.  During the game, Adams led the Seahawks with 12 tackles (8 solo) and recorded his first sack of the season on Matt Ryan in the 38–25 win.
In the following week's game against the New England Patriots on Sunday Night Football, Adams recorded nine tackles and sacked Cam Newton once during the 35–30 win.

In Week 3 against the Dallas Cowboys, Adams suffered a groin injury and did not return. Adams came back from injury in Week 9 against the Buffalo Bills.  During the game, Adams recorded 1.5 sacks on Josh Allen during the 44–34 loss.
In the following week's game against the Los Angeles Rams, Adams recorded two sacks on Jared Goff, including a strip sack that was recovered by the Seahawks, during the 23–16 loss.

In Week 12 against the Philadelphia Eagles on Monday Night Football, Adams led the team with nine tackles and recorded one sack on Carson Wentz during the 23–17 win.

In Week 14 against his former team, the New York Jets, Adams recorded a sack on former teammate Sam Darnold during the 40–3 win.  This was Adams' 8.5th sack on the season, breaking the NFL record for most sacks in a season by a defensive back. Against the Washington Football Team, Adams expanded his hold on the record with another sack, bringing his season total to 9.5 sacks.

Adams was named to his third straight Pro Bowl on December 21, 2020. Adams and teammate Quandre Diggs became the first safety tandem to make the Pro Bowl together since former Seahawks safeties Earl Thomas and Kam Chancellor in 2015.

2021
On August 17, 2021, Adams signed a four-year deal with the Seattle Seahawks. Adams' deal consists of a top value of $72 million, with a $20 million signing bonus and $38 million guaranteed, making him the highest paid safety in NFL history at the time. Against the Green Bay Packers on November 14, 2021, Adams recorded his first interception of the season off of Aaron Rodgers in a 17–0 loss. Adams suffered a torn labrum during the Seahawks Week 13 win over the San Francisco 49ers, and was placed on injured reserve on December 10, 2021.

2022
During the Seahawks Week 1 win against the Denver Broncos, Adams suffered a torn quad tendon in the second quarter that ended his season. He was placed on injured reserve on September 15, 2022.

NFL career statistics

Regular season

Records and achievements

Awards 
 3x Pro Bowl (2018–2020)
 First-team All-Pro (2019)
 Second-team All-Pro (2018, 2020)
 NFL Top 100: 37th (2019), 27th (2020), 31st (2021)

NFL Records 
Most sacks in a single season by a defensive back in NFL history: 9.5

Personal life
His father, running back George Adams, played in the National Football League (NFL) from 1985 to 1991. Adams is also a pescatarian.

References

External links

 Seattle Seahawks bio
 LSU Tigers bio
 

1995 births
Living people
American football safeties
LSU Tigers football players
New York Jets players
People from Carrollton, Texas
Players of American football from Texas
Seattle Seahawks players
Sportspeople from the Dallas–Fort Worth metroplex
American Conference Pro Bowl players
National Conference Pro Bowl players